

The DFW C.I was a German reconnaissance aircraft produced during World War I. Derived from the company's B.I design of 1914, the C.I kept the same basic fuselage design, but dispensed with the B.I's distinctive crescent-shaped wings, replacing them with wings with conventional straight leading edges. Engine power was also increased from 90-112 kW (120-150 hp).

The C.II was almost identical, except that it reversed the seating arrangements for the pilot and observer, placing the observer in the rear cockpit and providing him with a Parabellum MG14 machine gun on a ring mount.

Specifications (C.II)

References

1910s German military reconnaissance aircraft
C.I
Single-engined tractor aircraft
Biplanes
Aircraft first flown in 1915